Baynards was a railway station on the Cranleigh Line. The line was single track and opened on 2 October 1865.

The station comprises the stationmaster's house, two waiting rooms, covered platforms, storesheds, a booking hall, a porch and a large goods shed. The station covers in all .

History
It was built for Lord Thurlow, the owner of nearby Baynards Park, whose land was on the route of the proposed railway line. As a condition of sale, Lord Thurlow insisted on having a station built to serve his estate, despite there being no nearby settlement. The station was also used as the local post office in times when up to 30 horses and carts would queue outside on market days.

Near the station was the Baynards Brick and Tile Works which was served by its own private siding. In early years it was a brickworks, producing Fuller's earth for the wool industry, and then foundry clay in later years. It then became a chemical processing works, receiving annually 400 tons of goods by rail (including sulphur from Italy via the Thames docks, tin from Swansea and packaging from Sittingbourne), whilst also sending out its own goods, from seed dressings to polishing compounds.

The station closed in June 1965 when the Cranleigh Line was closed as part of the Beeching Axe.

The station was used in the 1957 BBC television adaptation of The Railway Children, and several films including: They Were Sisters (1945), Room at the Top (1959), The Grass Is Greener (1960), The Horsemasters (1961), Monster of Terror and Rotten to the Core (both 1965).

Other Cranleigh Line stations
Guildford

 Horsham

References

External links

 Baynards railway station at Disused-Stations.org.uk
 "Cranleigh Line" website
 Baynards station on navigable 1946 O.S. map

Disused railway stations in Surrey
Railway stations in Great Britain opened in 1865
Railway stations in Great Britain closed in 1965
Beeching closures in England
Former London, Brighton and South Coast Railway stations
Cranleigh